Róbert Frölich (also spelled Fröhlich) (born 12 November 1965, Budapest) is a Hungarian rabbi and retired brigadier general, former camp chief rabbi, and, since 2015, chief rabbi of the Dohány Street Synagogue.

Life
Frölich graduated high school in 1984, and completed his studies in 1990 at the Budapest University of Jewish Studies, and was inaugurated as a rabbi. In 1990 and 1991 in Jerusalem, he conducted two in-service training sessions to be a rabbi.

Between 1986 and 1988, he worked as a religious teacher at the Bethlen Square Synagogue, and in 1989, became a deputy rabbi at the Dózsa György Street synagogue. Hence in 1990, he was appointed a rabbi at the Újpest synagogue. After 1991, he replaced the rabbi at the Pava Street Synagogue. In 1993, he left from there, and was then appointed as the rabbi at the  Dohány Street Synagogue where he still is today. On 5 January 2015, the then Budapest Jewish Community leader, Dávid Schwerzoff, dismissed Frölich because of an unfair tendering entry system, however, the community of the Dohány Street Synagogue and the Rabbinical Board also rejected and confirmed the position on January 8.

In addition to the religious teaching career, he also had a military (military chaplain) career. In 1991, he became a teacher at the Lauder Javne Secular Jewish School and the Anne Frank Gymnasium in 1996, leaving the former in 1993. He became a professor at the Budapest University of Jewish Studies, and from 1998, became an assistant professor.

In 1991 he joined the War Office, where for the first time, there was a religious expert, and in 1993 he became a military chaplain assigned to the Office pastor. From there, in 1994, he was promoted to the chaplain corps, Jewish Chaplain Service AG, a leading camp Camp Rabbinate, and earned colonel rank. In 1995, he was appointed brigadier general. He retired in 2012 from military service, and was succeeded by Rabbi Péter Joel Totha.

He is married with two children.

External links
 Szakmai Önéletrajz (Frölich Róbert), honvedelem.hu (hozzáférés: 2015. január 28.)
 Who is Who Magyarországon (hozzáférés: 2015. január 28.)
 Antiszemita levél a mezőberényi városházáról, hír6.hu, 2008. November 2.
 Továbbra is Frölich Róbert a Dohány utcai zsinagóga főrabbija, hirado.hu, 2015. január 8.

References

1965 births
Jewish military personnel
Hungarian military personnel
Rabbis from Budapest
Living people
Hungarian Jews